Édouard Marcelle (1 October 1909 – 9 November 2001) was a French rower who won a silver medal in the coxed pairs at the 1928 Summer Olympics, together with his elder brother Armand.

References

External links 
 
 

1909 births
2001 deaths
French male rowers
Olympic rowers of France
Olympic silver medalists for France
Rowers at the 1928 Summer Olympics
Olympic medalists in rowing
Sportspeople from Reims
Medalists at the 1928 Summer Olympics
20th-century French people